Nikola "Nikki" Špear (22 February 1944 – 2 December 2017) was a Yugoslavian international tennis player. Špear won the senior championship of Yugoslavia 1968, 1972, 1973 and 1975. He also organised tennis events in his hometown of Subotica.

He competed in the Davis Cup a number of times, from 1969 to 1975.

He was the coach of Denmark Davis Cup team, the German Fed Cup team and the Davis Cup team of FR Yugoslavia.

Grand Prix/WCT career finals

Doubles: 2 (0–2)

Singles performance timeline

Records

References

External links
 
 
 
 Nikola Špear at eurosport.com

1944 births
2017 deaths
Yugoslav male tennis players
Serbian male tennis players
Serbian tennis coaches
Sportspeople from Subotica